The 1998–99 NBA season was the eleventh season for the Charlotte Hornets in the National Basketball Association. On March 23, 1998, the owners of all 29 NBA teams voted 27–2 to reopen the league's collective bargaining agreement, seeking changes to the league's salary cap system, and a ceiling on individual player salaries. The National Basketball Players Association (NBPA) opposed to the owners' plan, and wanted raises for players who earned the league's minimum salary. After both sides failed to reach an agreement, the owners called for a lockout, which began on July 1, 1998, putting a hold on all team trades, free agent signings and training camp workouts, and cancelling many NBA regular season and preseason games. Due to the lockout, the NBA All-Star Game, which was scheduled to be played in Philadelphia on February 14, 1999, was also cancelled. However, on January 6, 1999, NBA commissioner David Stern, and NBPA director Billy Hunter finally reached an agreement to end the lockout. The deal was approved by both the players and owners, and was signed on January 20, ending the lockout after 204 days. The regular season began on February 5, and was cut short to just 50 games instead of the regular 82-game schedule.

During the off-season, the Hornets signed free agents Derrick Coleman, three-point specialist Chuck Person, Eldridge Recasner and Chucky Brown. However, the Hornets began their season dealing with injuries, as Anthony Mason was lost for the entire season with a biceps injury suffered in practice a few days before the start of the season, and All-Star forward Glen Rice was also out with an elbow injury. The Hornets struggled losing eight of their first nine games, which led to a disappointing 4–11 start to the season, as head coach Dave Cowens resigned and was replaced with assistant Paul Silas.

A few days later, Rice was traded along with J.R. Reid, and B. J. Armstrong to the Los Angeles Lakers in exchange for All-Star guard Eddie Jones, and Elden Campbell. Armstrong was released by the Lakers, and later signed with the Orlando Magic. The team improved under Silas posting a 22–13 record, including a nine-game winning streak in April. The Hornets finished fifth in the Central Division with a 26–24 record. However, despite their above .500 record, they failed to qualify for the playoffs for the first time since the 1995–96 season.

Jones averaged 17.0 points and 3.0 steals per game with the team in 30 games after the trade, and was selected to the NBA All-Defensive Second Team, while Campbell averaged 15.3 points, 9.4 rebounds and 1.8 blocks per game in 32 games. In addition, Bobby Phills provided the team with 14.3 points and 1.4 steals per game, while David Wesley contributed 14.1 points, 6.4 assists and 2.0 steals per game, Coleman averaged 13.1 points and 8.9 rebounds per game, Brown provided with 8.5 points and 3.6 rebounds per game, and Person contributed 6.1 points per game.

The Hornets finished sixth the NBA in home-game attendance for the season. Following the season, Person signed as a free agent with the Seattle SuperSonics, and Brown signed with the San Antonio Spurs.

Offseason

NBA Draft

Roster

Roster Notes
 Power forward Anthony Mason missed the entire season due to a ruptured biceps injury.

Regular season

Season standings

Record vs. opponents

Game log

Player statistics

Awards and records
 Eddie Jones, NBA All-Defensive Second Team

Transactions
 January 21, 1999

Signed Brad Miller as a free agent.

Signed Eldridge Recasner as a free agent.

Signed Charles Shackleford as a free agent.

Signed Chucky Brown as a free agent.

Signed Derrick Coleman as a free agent.
 January 26, 1999

Signed Chuck Person as a free agent.
 February 3, 1999

Signed Joe Wolf as a free agent.
 February 28, 1999

Signed Willie Burton as a free agent.
 March 8, 1999

Waived Willie Burton.
 March 10, 1999

Waived Joe Wolf.

Traded B. J. Armstrong, J. R. Reid and Glen Rice to the Los Angeles Lakers for Elden Campbell and Eddie Jones.
 March 16, 1999

Waived Travis Williams.
 March 17, 1999

Signed Corey Beck to the first of two 10-day contracts.
 April 6, 1999

Signed Corey Beck to a contract for the rest of the season.

Player Transactions Citation:

References

Charlotte Hornets seasons
Char
Bob
Bob